The Hiram House was the first settlement house in Cleveland and one of the first in the United States. It was founded in 1896 by George A. Bellamy and students from Hiram College.

History

Hiram House was founded by students from Hiram College who had been studying settlement work. In June 1896, the students rented a house near the Whiskey Island area of Cleveland, which was predominantly populated by Irish immigrants at that time. George Bellamy joined the group, which shortly thereafter moved the settlement house to a site on Orange Avenue, in what was then the city's main Jewish neighborhood. Hiram House was incorporated in 1899, and within a year had raised enough funds to construct a new four-story building, which served until 1941. Financial support came from the Mather, Prentiss, and Hunt families.

Hiram House initially offered English classes for immigrants to assist in passing the exams for citizenship. With the new building came college preparatory courses, a kindergarten, a summer camp, and various clubs and other recreational activities. Among the teachers at Hiram House in 1900 was Louise Brigham, who later became known for designing furniture out of packing crates. 

The Hiram House Camp, located on a  site in the nearby Chagrin River Valley village of Moreland Hills, was donated in 1902. The organization has operated a summer camp continuously since 1897.

References

Further reading
 Grabowski, John J. "A Social Settlement in a Neighborhood in Transition, Hiram House, Cleveland, Ohio, 1896-1926" (Ph.D. diss., CWRU, 1977)
 Hiram House Records, Western Reserve Historical Society

External links 
 Hiram House

1896 establishments in Ohio
Houses in Cuyahoga County, Ohio
Settlement houses in the United States
Summer camps in Ohio